James Gordon "Bo" Gritz (born January 18, 1939) is an American former United States Army Special Forces officer and presidential candidate. After serving in the Vietnam War and retiring from the military, Gritz has worked on attempted POW rescues in conjunction with the Vietnam War POW/MIA issue. Gritz ran for United States president under the Populist Party in 1992 under the slogan: "God, Guns and Gritz," and published an isolationist political manifesto titled "The Bill of Gritz". Gritz lives in Sandy Valley, Nevada and has four children.

Early life
Gritz was born on January 18, 1939, in Enid, Oklahoma. His father served in the Army Air Force in World War II and was killed in action. He was raised by his maternal grandparents. After being expelled from his local high school, Gritz attended and graduated from Fork Union Military Academy in Virginia.

Military service 
Gritz enlisted in the Army on August 20, 1957, and shortly thereafter attended Officer Candidate School (OCS). He was promoted to the rank of captain in 1963, and to major in 1967.

In Vietnam, he commanded detachment "B-36", 5th Special Forces Group (Airborne) for a time. B-36 was a mixed American and Cambodian-Vietnamese MIKE Force, an eventually battalion-size unit composed mostly of local indigenous people serving as mercenaries that operated in the III Corps area of southern South Vietnam near the Cambodian border. His successful missions included finding and retrieving the black box of a Lockheed U-2 spy plane downed inside enemy territory in Cambodia in December 1966.

After six years in Vietnam, Gritz served in a variety of assignments, including commanding Special Forces in Latin America 1975–1977, as a Desk Officer for the Middle East, and Chief of Congressional Relations for the Defense Security Agency (International Security Affairs) in the Office of the Secretary of Defense (1977–1979) until his retirement in 1979 at the rank of lieutenant colonel. According to Gritz, backed by video evidence, following his formal retirement he also trained the Afghan mujahideen in America on behalf of the government.

General William Westmoreland in his memoir, A Soldier Reports, cites Gritz as "The" American Soldier. Gritz received an array of military awards, and some of these have been called into question. A memo regarding his awards and award recommendations during his time in Vietnam seems to indicate that Gritz was personally involved with the recommendation of some of his medals, including the Legion of Merit, and that some of his award recommendations cited the same missions and incidents, effectively awarding Gritz multiple medals for the same missions, including the Legion of Merit, Air Medal, Silver Star, Bronze Star, and Army Commendation Medal.

Later life

Attempts to locate prisoners of war 
During the early 1980s, as part of the Vietnam War POW/MIA issue, Gritz undertook a series of private trips into Southeast Asia, in attempts to locate U.S. prisoners of war who some Americans believed had been detained since the Vietnam War, by the communist governments of Laos and Vietnam, e.g., at Nhommarath. In his forays into Laos, Gritz worked with his fellow special forces veterans and with Laotian anti-communist guerrillas, one of whom was killed by the men of the exiled Laotian warlord Phoumi Nosavan who also abducted the American search party member Dominic "Zap" Zappone for ransom. Initially, some abortive technical assistance was provided by elements of the Defense Intelligence Agency in 1981. The later adventures have been financed by high profile donors like Clint Eastwood and Ross Perot. Operating out of Thailand, from where he was repeatedly deported by the authorities, Gritz used aliases such as "Richard Patrick Clark". He also testified as a witness before the House committee headed by Stephen Solarz in 1983, but was unable to provide any evidence of the existence of the POWs.

These activities were heavily publicized, controversial and widely decried as haphazard. For instance, as some commentators stated, few supposedly secret missions involved bringing to the border towns women openly selling commemorative POW-rescue T-shirts. In the book Inside Delta Force, CSM Eric L. Haney, a former Delta Force operator, claims that the unit was twice told to prepare for a mission involving the rescue of American POWs from Vietnam. However, both times the missions were scrubbed, according to Haney, when Gritz suddenly appeared in the spotlight, drawing too much attention to the issue and making the missions too difficult to accomplish. In 1983, Gritz (who had surrendered himself by walking into a police station) and four of his associates were tried and convicted in Thailand of illegally importing radio equipment during their "Operation Lazarus Omega"; one of them, a former Navy SEAL David Scott Weekly also known as "Doctor Death", was also later convicted in America of smuggling explosives. Thailand authorities expressed concern that the Vietnamese forces in Laos would retaliate against them for cross-border armed intrusions and threatened to jail Gritz for 20 years. Vietnamese Foreign Minister Nguyen Co Thach called Gritz's actions "a flagrant violation of the sovereignty of Laos that everyone should denounce."

Conspiracy research and anti-war activism
In 1986, after a trip to Burma (now Myanmar) to interview drug kingpin Khun Sa regarding possible locations of U.S. POWs, Gritz returned from Burma with a videotaped interview of Khun Sa purporting to name several officials in the Reagan administration involved in narcotics trafficking in Southeast Asia. Among those named was Richard Armitage, who later served as Deputy Secretary of State during George W. Bush's first term as president. During this period Gritz established contacts with the Christic Institute, a progressive group which was then pursuing a lawsuit against the U.S. government over charges of drug trafficking in both Southeast Asia and Central America. In 1989, he established the Center for Action, which was active on a number of issues, mostly pertaining to conspiracy theories. Attempting to build bridges among conspiracy theorists and unite activists of both the left and the right, he held a conference in Las Vegas called "Freedom Call '90". Speakers at that conference included October Surprise conspiracy theory researcher Barbara Honegger, Bill Davis of the Christic Institute, far-right writer Eustace Mullins, and several others.

This newfound interest proved to be almost as controversial as his earlier missions searching for POWs. During the 1991 Persian Gulf War, Gritz was an opponent of the war, and linked it to a conspiracy theory alleging plans to implement a one-world government, known as the "New World Order". He appeared on Pacifica Radio stations in California as a guest several times, and for a short time was in demand as a speaker to left-wing and anti-war audiences. However, during this period he also became closely associated with the Christian Patriot movement on the right, and spoke at conferences sponsored by Christian Identity pastor Pete Peters. When these associations became known to those on the left, especially after the publication of a report by the Los Angeles-based group People Against Racist Terror calling Gritz a "front man for fascism", left-wing audiences lost interest in Gritz, and the Christic Institute and Pacifica Radio cut off any further association. He has since distanced himself from the movement.

Populist Party presidential tickets 
In the 1988 election, Gritz was the candidate for Vice President of the United States on the Populist Party line; initially, unbeknownst to him, he was billed as the running mate of former Ku Klux Klansman David Duke. Gritz pulled out early in the race and publicly distanced himself from Duke and ran instead for a Nevada Congressional seat. Gritz was then replaced by Floyd Parker on some ballots. Gritz has claimed that he accepted the party's nomination in the belief that he would be the running mate of James Traficant. Shortly after meeting Duke, Gritz wrote that Duke was "a brash, untraveled, overly opinionated, bigoted young man" and that "I will not support anyone that I know to hate any class of Americans."

In the 1992 election, after failing to secure the U.S. Taxpayers' Party's nomination, Gritz ran for President of the United States, again with the Populist Party. Under the campaign slogan "God, Guns and Gritz" and publishing his political manifesto "The Bill of Gritz" (playing on his last name rhyming with "rights"), he called for staunch opposition to what he called "global government" and the "New World Order", ending all foreign aid, and abolishing the federal income tax and the Federal Reserve System. During the campaign, Gritz openly proclaimed the United States to be a "Christian Nation", stating that the country's legal statutes "should reflect unashamed acceptance of Almighty God and His Laws." He received 106,152 votes nationwide, or only 0.14 percent of the popular vote. In Utah, he received 3.84 percent of the vote and in Idaho he received 2.13 percent of the vote. In Duchesne County and Oneida County, Idaho, his support topped ten percent, whilst in Franklin County, Idaho, Gritz received over twelve percent and was only 23 votes away from pushing Bill Clinton into fourth place – which has not happened to a major party nominee in any county nationwide since 1916. During his presidential run, part of Gritz's standard stump speech was an idea to pay off the National debt by minting a coin at the Treasury and sending it to the Federal Reserve. This predates the 2012 trillion-dollar coin concept. Among other things, the "Bill of Gritz" called for the complete closing of the border with Mexico, and the dissolution of the Federal Reserve.

Involvement with religious and survivalist groups
In 1984, Gritz and his wife Claudia were baptized into the Church of Jesus Christ of Latter-day Saints (LDS Church). However, amid infidelity scandals, Gritz's stake president refused to renew Gritz's temple recommend until Gritz could prove that he had paid federal income tax. In response, Gritz resigned his membership in the LDS Church. In 1999, Gritz and his then fourth wife Judy Kirsch became involved in the Church of Israel, a group that originated within the Latter Day Saint movement and has become involved with the Christian Identity movement, from which he has later distanced himself. While he was married to Judy, Gritz was accused of supporting the Christian Identity ideology, in which people of Celtic and Germanic descent can be traced back to the "Lost Tribes of Israel". Many adherents consider Jews to be the Satanic offspring of Eve and the Serpent, while non-whites are "mud peoples" created before Adam and Eve. He has been accused of White supremacy by some, although he denounced the belief in an interview with The Militia Watchdog, saying "I've served with black, white, yellow, brown, red; all religions; nobody ever asked you about your religion, your blood bleeds red the same as everyone else." 

In 1994, together with former Arizona State Senator Jerry Gillespie and other partners, Gritz established a 200-acre survivalist community and paramilitary training center in Kamiah, Idaho (contiguous to the Nez Perce people) called Almost Heaven. He left Almost Heaven in late 1998, following his suicide attempt (a self-inflicted gunshot wound to the chest with a .45 Colt pistol while dressed in full military regalia with all his medals). Under influence of the  Church of Israel ideology, Gritz then moved to Nevada where he rebranded his  Center for Action (originally dedicated to "putting accountability back into government") as the more spiritual Fellowship of Eternal Warriors, a selected group of "warrior-priests" dedicated to oppose the forces of evil (defined by him as a globalist cabal of feminists, male homosexuals, "and other liberal activists ... promoting abortion, pornography, pedophilia, Godless laws, adultery, New Age, international banking", and led by "the worshippers of Baal with their roots still in Babylonian mysticism".). Five years after Gritz had left Almost Heaven, the community was described as almost defunct.

Several times, Gritz used his influence and reputation in the Christian Patriot movement in attempts to negotiate conclusions between legal authorities and far-right activists. In 1992, Gritz attracted national attention as mediator to the crisis involving his fellow Army Special Forces veteran (as well as Christian Identity follower and White separatist) Randy Weaver at Ruby Ridge, Idaho. He intervened on behalf of Weaver who, with his family, was living at his survivalist refuge at Ruby Ridge, after U.S. Marshals attempted to arrest him for failure to appear in court. The federal siege, which resulted in the deaths of a U.S. Marshal and Weaver's son and wife, ended after Gritz convinced Weaver, his daughter, and family friend Kevin Harris to leave their cabin and place his faith and trust in the court system. Attorney Gerry Spence was asked by Gritz to defend Weaver, which he did successfully, and in turn defended his action to do so in a letter to Alan Hirschfield. In 1996, Gritz unsuccessfully attempted to negotiate a conclusion to the standoff by the Montana Freemen, an anti-government White separatist militia group of Christian Patriot sovereign citizens who were wanted on an assortment of charges. Randy Weaver accompanied him during the trip but was not allowed by the FBI to enter the Freemen's ranch. After speaking with the Freemen, who have taken an "oath to God" not to get out unless their demands were met, Gritz left in frustration, stating that they presented him with what he called a religious and legal "mumbo-jumbo" to support their claims, and predicting the outcome as the Freemen being arrested by the FBI following "a confrontation of wills".

Later activities
In 1998, Gritz organized a fruitless search for the Centennial Olympic Park bomber Eric Rudolph in order to save Rudolph's life and persuade him to surrender to law enforcement. In 2005, Gritz became an active protester for intervention in the Terri Schiavo case. On 19 March 2005, when her feeding tube was removed, he was arrested for trespassing after trying to enter the hospice where she lived. Beginning in 2014, Gritz hosted a radio show on Americanvoiceradio.com known as Freedom Call.

Writings 
Gritz is the author of three books. The first, A Nation Betrayed, was published in 1989 and contained Gritz's allegations of drug trafficking and a POW coverup, based on the Khun Sa interview. The second, Called To Serve, was published in 1992 and expanded on the previous book to cover a wide range of conspiracies, including the assassination of John F. Kennedy, and allegations of a conspiracy to establish a new world order. His third book is titled My Brother's Keeper and was published in 2003.

In fiction and documentaries
The character of John "Hannibal" Smith on the 1980s television series The A-Team was loosely based on Gritz, as were some of Chuck Norris' film heroes. Reportedly, Gritz also partially inspired several other characters, including these of Colonel Kurtz in the 1978 film Apocalypse Now, and John Rambo, the protagonist of the Rambo franchise. Gritz himself played the character of Lt. Col. Steel, a highly fictionalized version of himself, in the 1990 film Rescue Force.

The real Gritz was portrayed by Bob Gunton in the 1996 television film The Siege at Ruby Ridge (Ruby Ridge: An American Tragedy), as well as by Vic Browder in the first episode of the 2018 television miniseries WACO. In 1983, actor William Shatner purchased entertainment rights to Gritz's life story.

Gritz's community Almost Heaven featured in the episode "Survivalists" of Louis Theroux's Weird Weekends in 1998. The 2017 documentary Erase and Forget had filmmaker Andrea Luka Zimmerman follow Gritz for more than 10 years, including re-enacting scenes from his life.

Works

Books
 Spycraft (c.1984-90). .
 A Nation Betrayed. (1988); Sandy Valley, Nev.: Lazarus Pub. Co. (1989). . .
 Called to Serve. Sandy Valley, Nev.: Lazarus Pub. Co. (May 1991). Autobiography. . .
 My Brother's Keeper. Sandy Valley, Nev.: Lazarus Pub. Co. (2003). .

Contributions
 Foreword to Shadows on the Wall, by Stan Krasnoff. Australia: Allen & Unwin (2003). . .

Public speaking
 "A Nation Betrayed." A public lecture in the Cathedral of Saint Mary of the Assumption (Jun. 1, 1990).

Filmography
 Millennium Factor: The Truth About Y2K (1999). Written and directed by Les Rayburn.

References

Further reading
 DeBartolo, Anthony (Jan. 1, 1999). "A Warrior Brought Down by Love." Chicago Tribune.

External links
 Official website via Wayback Machine
 Appearances on C-SPAN
 Bo Gritz at IMDb

|-

1939 births
20th-century American politicians
20th-century far-right politicians in the United States
American anti-war activists
American conspiracy theorists
American University alumni
Candidates in the 1992 United States presidential election
Christian Identity
Converts to Mormonism
Former Latter Day Saints
Living people
Members of the United States Army Special Forces
Military personnel from Enid, Oklahoma
Nevada Constitutionalists
People from Kamiah, Idaho
Politicians from Enid, Oklahoma
Populist Party (United States, 1984) politicians
Recipients of the Air Medal
Recipients of the Distinguished Flying Cross (United States)
Recipients of the Legion of Merit
Recipients of the Silver Star
Recipients of the Soldier's Medal
United States Army officers
United States Army personnel of the Vietnam War
Vietnam War POW/MIA activists